Milner is a rural village (small town) and locality in the Township of Langley in the Fraser Valley of British Columbia, Canada.  It is located along the British Columbia Electric Railway line (now the Southern Railway of B.C. northeast of the City of Langley and just southwest of Fort Langley.

Local businesses include Milner Downs Equestrian Center, Milner Village Garden Centre, Milner Feed and Pet Supply Ltd., and Milner Valley Cheese.

Milner Chapel
Milner Methodist Church was founded in 1885 and the church was dedicated in April, 1886, as Langley Prairie Methodist Church, but it soon became known as Milner Methodist Church. With church union in 1925, it became Milner United Church. At various times, Milner United Church has been a part of various pastoral charges: Langley-Milner, Langley, Murrayville-Fort Langley, and Fort Langley-Milner. Preliminary discussions were held in May 1990 regarding amalgamating Milner with St. Andrew's United Church. On September 16, 1990 a report on amalgamation was discussed and approved by the Milner congregation. It was decided that morning services at Milner would be discontinued at the end of September 1990. It was also decided to hold an evening service on the fourth Sunday of every Monday, beginning on November 24, 1990. On January 1, 1991, the Milner United Church congregation of the Fort Langley-Milner pastoral charge was amalgamated with the St. Andrew's United Church congregation. The Milner property was sold, and the new one-point pastoral charge was named St. Andrew's-Fort Langley Pastoral Charge.

References

Neighbourhoods in Langley, British Columbia
Langley, British Columbia (district municipality)